"Light Me Up" is a song by Polish music producer Gromee featuring vocals by Swedish singer Lukas Meijer. The song was released as a digital download on 15 February 2018. The song was written by Gromee, Lukas Meijer, Mahan Moin and Christian Rabb.

Eurovision Song Contest

The song represented Poland in the Eurovision Song Contest 2018 in Lisbon, Portugal. The song competed in the second semi-final, held on 10 May 2018. It did not advance to the grand final.

Chart performance
In April, "Light Me Up" peaked at number 1 in Poland and stayed on the top for 4 weeks in a row becoming the most successful Polish entry for Eurovision at this chart. The song got an airplay in Czech Republic, Slovakia and Russia a few weeks before Poland's performance on second semi final as well.

Music video
The official music video is filmed in Barcelona.

Track listing

Charts

Weekly charts

Year-end charts

Certifications

Release history

See also
List of number-one singles of 2018 (Poland)

References

Eurovision songs of Poland
Eurovision songs of 2018
Number-one singles in Poland
2018 songs
2018 singles
Sony Music singles